The Endurance World Championship (FIM EWC) is the premier worldwide endurance championship in motorcycle road racing. The championship season consists of a series of endurance races (with a duration of six, eight, twelve or twenty-four hours) held on permanent racing facilities. The results of each race are combined to determine three World Championships – riders, teams and manufacturers.

Until 2016, the championship was held on a yearly basis, but in order to take advantage of the winter break in MotoGP and Superbikes season, since September 2016 it runs from September to July, with the European races held in September, and then spring and summer of the next year. Scheduling arrangements for the 2020 and 2021 COVID-19 years were different.

History
The long distance races appeared almost at the same time of the invention of the internal combustion engine at the end of the 19th century, with races being held between major cities such as Paris-Rouen in 1894, Paris-Bordeaux, Paris-Madrid and others. In those years cars and motos raced together, competing for speed (fastest time) or regularity (achieving a certain objective time). These races on open roads were very dangerous, and the successive fatal tragedies (such as 1903 Paris-Madrid) move the race to roads closed to normal traffic (before the creation of real racing circuits) led to the separation of cars and motos, and the long distance races turning into rallies.

The Bol d’Or (most famous and prestigious Endurance race) was held for the first time in 1922 on the circuit of Vaujours, near Paris (a beaten-earth road circuit used since 1888 for 24-hour competitions for bicycles).
Other endurance races were created after World War II, such as 24 Hour Race in Warsage (Belgium) in 1951, the 500 Miles of Thruxton in 1955, the 24 Hours of Montjuich in Barcelona in 1957, and the 24 hours of Monza (Italy) in 1959.. At the beginning, most races were held over 24 Hours, but soon shorter races were introduced, defined in terms either of distance (500 Miles, 1000 Miles, and much later even 200 Miles) or of time (12 Hours, 8 Hours or 6 Hours).

The series was founded in 1960 as the FIM Endurance Cup. Initially it was made up of four races: Thruxton 500, 24 hours of Montjuïc, 24 hours of Warsage and the Bol d'Or.

The Bol d’Or was not held between 1961 and 1968, while the 1000 km of Paris was held twice on the circuit of Montlhéry. In the first decade, the FIM EC races were held essentially in Great Britain, Italy and Spain – the three countries with more riders

In 1976 the FIM Endurance Cup became the European Championship and in 1980 a World Championship. During the 1980s the Endurance World Championship calendar numbered up to ten events. The championship's popularity gradually declined and the calendar was gradually reduced to just the four so-called “classics”: 24 Hours of Le Mans, 24 Hours of Liège (held in Spa-Francorchamps), 8 Hours Of Suzuka, and the Bol d'Or (held mostly on Paul Ricard or Magny-Cours).

In 1989 and 1990 the Championship went back to a World Cup status, as the number of events required by the FIM Sporting Code was not reached.

The 4 events championship (with 24 Hours of Liège being replaced by other races) in the same year was maintained until 2016. In 2015 FIM and the  pan-European television sports network, Eurosport signed a deal for the promotion and coverage of the competition. With this, the organization re-ordered the events, in order to the new championship starting in September and finishing in July, with the European races being held during the winter avoiding the MotoGP and Superbikes schedules.

Races

World champions

Points systems
Points systems

 For Manufacturers only the highest placed motorcycle will gain points, according to the position in the race.

 For races with duration from 12 to 24 hours, the Top 10 teams after 8 hrs and 16 hrs receive bonus points.
 Manufacturers are not concerned by this rule and will not receive bonus points.

 On each race,Top 5 teams on starting grid receive bonus points.

Latest races

Classes and specifications
Motorcycles must be based on road going models with a valid FIM homologation

Formula EWC
Formula EWC for the FIM EWC Endurance World Championship. Black number plate background, white-light headlamps and minimum weight 175 kg. This is the top category and performance improvements during the race are possible. The overall appearance of the bike cannot deviate from the homologated model, but the fork, damper, swing-arm, brakes, radiator and exhaust can be modified. Teams are also given a relatively free hand to soup up engine performance. The chassis is equipped with a quick wheel change system.

Displacement
 4 cylinders Over 600 cc up to 1000 cc 4-stroke
 3 cylinders Over 750 cc up to 1000 cc 4-stroke
 2 cylinders Over 850 cc up to 1200 cc 4-stroke

The displacement capacities must remain at the homologated size. Modifying the
bore and stroke to reach class limits is not allowed.

Superstock
Superstock for the FIM World Endurance Cup. Red number plate background, yellow-light headlamps and minimum weight of 175 kg. For Superstock, the machines are practically identical to production bikes. The engine is as provided by the manufacturer, with very limited modifications permitted (injector jets and fuel mapping, clutch reinforcement, a different exhaust silencer, etc.). Wheels must remain as homologated, so teams need a good wheel change strategy at pit stops.

Displacement
 3 cylinders and 4 cylinders Over 750 cc up to 1000 cc 4-stroke
 2 cylinders Over 850 cc up to 1200 cc 4-stroke

The displacement capacities must remain at the homologated size. Modifying the bore and stroke to reach class limits is not allowed.
In both Formula EWC and Superstock, the fuel tank is modified to a maximum capacity of 24 litres and fitted with a quick refuelling device.

Experimental
Green number plate background, yellow-light headlamps and minimum weight of 165 kg. The category includes motorcycles whose engine, main frame or suspension are completely different from the design of the original models. Machines in the Experimental category appear in the general classification of the event but are not classified in the World Endurance Championship. They are only admitted to the start after deliberation by the Race Selection Committee, which selects the machine for its technical and innovative interest. This category can also include electrical machines.

Displacement
 4 cylinders Over 600 cc up to 1000 cc 4-stroke
 3 cylinders Over 750 cc up to 1000 cc 4-stroke

References

External links
 Official website
 Official website at FIM
 Race24.com Unofficial website, covering the championship since 1999. Archive of official site between 2005 and 2006
 

 
Motorcycle road racing series
Endurance motor racing
World motorcycle racing series
Fédération Internationale de Motocyclisme